The 1891 Wisbech by-election was held on 23 July 1891 after the incumbent Conservative MP, Charles William Selwyn retired due to poor health.  He had previously informed his local Conservative Association that his health would not allow him to undertake a contested election. and he died in 1893.

The seat was won by the Liberal candidate Arthur Brand.

References

By-elections to the Parliament of the United Kingdom in Cambridgeshire constituencies
July 1891 events
Wisbech
1891 elections in the United Kingdom
1891 in England
19th century in Cambridgeshire